Rafael dos Santos Franciscatti (born April 9, 1983) is a former Brazilian football player.

Club statistics

References

External links

J. League

1983 births
Living people
Brazilian footballers
J2 League players
Shonan Bellmare players
Brazilian expatriate footballers
Expatriate footballers in Japan
Association football midfielders